Senator Rivers may refer to:

Ann Rivers (born 1968), Washington State Senate
Cheryl Rivers (born 1951), Vermont State Senate
Eurith D. Rivers (1895–1967), Georgia State Senate